Thierry Rendall Correia (born 9 March 1999) is a Portuguese professional footballer who plays as a right-back for Spanish club Valencia CF.

Club career

Sporting CP
Born in Amadora, Lisbon metropolitan area of Cape Verdean descent, Correia joined Sporting CP's academy at the age of 10. He spent the better part of his first year as a senior with their under-23 team.

Correia made his competitive debut for the main squad on 29 November 2018, coming on as a late substitute for Bruno Gaspar in a 6–1 away win against Qarabağ FK in the group stage of the UEFA Europa League. His first start was the following 4 August, in the 5–0 loss to S.L. Benfica in the Supertaça Cândido de Oliveira.

On 11 August 2019, Correia played his first match in the Primeira Liga, featuring the entire 1–1 draw at C.S. Marítimo.

Valencia
On 2 September 2019, Correia signed a five-year contract with Valencia CF for a €12 million transfer fee. He made his Spanish La Liga debut later that month, playing the full 90 minutes in a 3–3 home draw against Getafe CF.

Correia scored his first goal as a senior on 7 January 2021, closing a 4–1 away victory over Yeclano Deportivo in the second round of the Copa del Rey. His first in the league came on 9 May, in the 3–0 home defeat of Real Valladolid.

International career
Correia earned his first cap for the Portugal under-21 side on 5 September 2019, in a 4–0 victory over Gibraltar in the 2021 UEFA European Championship qualifiers.

Career statistics

Club

Honours
Portugal U17
UEFA European Under-17 Championship: 2016

Portugal U19
UEFA European Under-19 Championship: 2018

References

External links

Valencia official profile

1999 births
Living people
People from Amadora
Portuguese sportspeople of Cape Verdean descent
Sportspeople from Lisbon District
Black Portuguese sportspeople
Portuguese footballers
Association football defenders
Primeira Liga players
Sporting CP footballers
La Liga players
Valencia CF players
Portugal youth international footballers
Portugal under-21 international footballers
Portuguese expatriate footballers
Expatriate footballers in Spain
Portuguese expatriate sportspeople in Spain